166 (one hundred [and] sixty-six) is the natural number following 165 and preceding 167.

In mathematics
166 is an even number and a composite number. It is a centered triangular number.

Given 166, the Mertens function returns 0. 166 is a Smith number in base 10.

In astronomy
 166 Rhodope is a dark main belt asteroid, in the Adeona family of asteroids
 166P/NEAT is a periodic comet and centaur in the outer Solar System
 HD 166 is the 6th magnitude star in the constellation Andromeda

In the military
 166th Signal Photo Company was the official photo unit in the 89th Division of George Patton's Third Army in World War II
 Convoy ON-166 was the 166th of the numbered ON series of merchant ship convoys outbound from the British Isles to North America departing February 11, 1943
 Marine Medium Helicopter Squadron 166 is a United States Marine Corps helicopter
  was a United States Coast Guard cutter during World War II
  was a United States Navy yacht. She was the first American vessel lost in World War I
  was a United States Navy  during World War II
  was a United States Navy  during the World War I
  was a United States Navy  during World War II
  was a United States Navy  ship during World War II
 USS Jamestown (AGTR-3/AG-166)  was a United States Navy Oxford-class technical research ship following World War II

In sports
 Sam Thompson’s 166 RBIs in 1887 stood as a Major League Baseball record until Babe Ruth broke the record in 1921

In transportation
 British Rail Class 166
 The now-defunct elevated IRT Third Avenue Line, 166th Street station in the Bronx, New York
 London Buses route 166
 Piaggio P.166 is a twin-engined push prop-driven utility aircraft developed by the Italian aircraft manufacturer Piaggio
 Banat Air Flight 166 crashed on take-off en route from Romania on December 13, 1995
 Alfa Romeo 166 and 166 2.4 JTD produced from 1998 to 2007
 Ferrari 166 model cars produced from 1948 to 1953
 Ferrari 166 Inter (1949) Coachbuilt street coupe and cabriolet

In other fields
166 is also:
 The year AD 166 or 166 BC
 The atomic number of an element temporarily called Unhexhexium

See also
 List of highways numbered 166
 United States Supreme Court cases, Volume 166
 United Nations Security Council Resolution 166

External links

 Number Facts and Trivia: 166
 The Number 166
 VirtueScience: 166
 166th Street (3rd Avenue El)

References 

Integers